Chase Beebe (born March 29, 1985) is a retired American professional mixed martial artist from Chicago, Illinois.  He most recently fought for the World Extreme Cagefighting organization, where he was the Bantamweight Champion. He lost that belt on February 13, 2008, to fellow Midwestern MMA fighter Miguel Torres. Beebe trains at Gilbert Grappling in Country Club Hills, IL.

Background
Prior to MMA, Chase was a successful wrestler. He was a four-time Illinois State Champion for Montini Catholic in Lombard, Illinois.

MMA career

World Extreme Cagefighting
Beebe made his WEC debut on March 24, 2007 at WEC 26: Condit vs. Alessio against Eddie Wineland for the WEC Bantamweight Championship, Beebe won via unanimous decision. On September 5, 2007, Beebe defended the WEC Bantamweight Championship against Rani Yahya at WEC 30 winning via unanimous decision.

Beebe was defeated by fellow Chicago native Miguel Torres losing the WEC Bantamweight Championship at WEC 32 via guillotine choke submission in round one. On June 1, 2008, Beebe was defeated by Will Ribeiro via split decision, following back to back loses Beebe was released by the WEC.

Ultimate Warrior Challenge
Chase was scheduled to fight Mike Easton for the UWC Bantamweight title on February 21, 2009.  However, he failed to show up at the official weigh-in the day before and was scratched from the card.  Beebe allegedly sustained a knee injury that hampered his training and ability to reduce his weight to the contractually-set limit of 135 pounds. Chase was replaced by Justin Robbins.

Chase got another shot at Mike Easton for the UWC 135 pound title. The bout took place on October 3, 2009 in Fairfax, Virginia. The fight was a grueling 5 rounder where Chase spent most of the fight on Easton's back trying to sink in a rear naked choke. Most people, including the commentators, scored the fight 49-46 in favor of Beebe but two of the judges didn't see it that way and handed Mike Easton a controversial split decision victory. The controversial decision was awarded Robbery of the Year by Sherdog for 2009. It has been announced that the Virginia Athletic Commission would review the Easton match which could lead to a “no contest” declaration.

Dream
Chase was one of the fighters who participated in DREAM's Featherweight (63 kg/138 lb) Grand Prix.  He lost in the first round to Joe Warren.

Chase returned to DREAM to face Yoshiro Maeda on October 25, 2009 at DREAM.12 He lost to Maeda via first round submission.

Bellator Fighting Championships
Beebe made his Bellator debut against Jose Vega at Bellator 43 in a Bellator Season 5 Bantamweight Tournament qualifying bout, Beebe won via guillotine choke submission in round one.

Chase entered into the Bellator Fighting Championships season five bantamweight tournament and fought Marcos Galvao in a Quarterfinal bout at Bellator 51 on September 24, 2011, Beebe lost via split decision.

Beebe defeated David Harris at Bellator 75 via unanimous decision. Beebe was defeated by Travis Marx via unanimous decision
at Bellator 90

Championships and awards
World Extreme Cagefighting
WEC Bantamweight Championship (One time)
World Fighting Championships
WFC Bantamweight Championship (One time)
Sherdog
Robbery of the Year (2009) vs. Mike Easton For UWC Bantamweight Championship

Mixed martial arts record

|-
| Loss
| align=center| 24–13–1
| Vincent Eazelle
| TKO (punches)
| CCCW: The Undertaking
| 
| align=center| 2
| align=center| 0:08
| Springfield, Illinois, United States
| 
|-
| Loss
| align=center| 24–12–1
| Ryan Roberts
| Decision (unanimous)
| Victory Fighting Championship 42
| 
| align=center| 3
| align=center| 5:00
| Omaha, Nebraska, United States
| 
|-
| Loss
| align=center| 24–11–1
| Joni Salovaara
| Submission (rear naked choke)
| Fight Festival 33
| 
| align=center| 1
| align=center| 3:48
| Helsinki, Finland
| 
|-
| Loss
| align=center| 24–10–1
| Tom Niinimäki 
| Decision (unanimous)
| Cage 22
| 
| align=center| 3
| align=center| 5:00
| Vantaa, Finland
| 
|-
| Loss
| align=center| 24–9–1
| Travis Marx
| Decision (unanimous)
| Bellator 90
| 
| align=center| 3
| align=center| 5:00
| West Valley City, Utah, United States
| 
|-
| Win
| align=center| 24–8–1
| Chris Tickle
| Decision (unanimous)
| Flawless FC 2-Hated
| 
| align=center| 3
| align=center| 5:00
| Hammond, Indiana, United States
| 
|-
| Win
| align=center| 23–8–1
| Javon Wright
| Submission (rear naked choke)
| Fight Hard MMA
| 
| align=center| 1
| align=center| 4:11
| St. Charles, Missouri, United States
| 
|-
| Win
| align=center| 22–8–1
| David Harris
| Decision (unanimous)
| Bellator 75
| 
| align=center| 3
| align=center| 5:00
| Hammond, Indiana, United States
| 
|-
| Win
| align=center| 21–8–1
| Mike Baskis
| Decision (unanimous)
| XFO 44
| 
| align=center| 3
| align=center| 5:00
| Hoffman Estates, Illinois, United States
| 
|-
| Win
| align=center| 20–8–1
| Corey Mahon
| KO (elbows)
| Colosseum Combat 21
| 
| align=center| 1
| align=center| 2:13
| Kokomo, Indiana, United States
| 
|-
| Win
| align=center| 19–8–1
| David Love
| Submission (rear naked choke)
| Colosseum Combat 20
| 
| align=center| 1
| align=center| 3:02
| Kokomo, Indiana, United States
| 
|-
| Draw 
| align=center| 18–8–1
| Enoch Wilson
| Draw (majority)
| UCS - Caged Combat 5
| 
| align=center| 5
| align=center| 5:00
| Grand Ronde, Oregon, United States
| 
|-
| Loss
| align=center| 18–8
| Marcos Galvão
| Decision (split)
| Bellator 51
| 
| align=center| 3
| align=center| 5:00
| Canton, Ohio, United States
|  
|-
| Win
| align=center| 18–7
| Ralph Acosta
| Submission (guillotine choke)
| WFC 2: Bad Boys
| 
| align=center| 1
| align=center| 0:41
| London, England
| 
|-
| Win
| align=center| 17–7
| Jose Vega
| Submission (guillotine choke)
| Bellator 43
| 
| align=center| 1
| align=center| 4:06
| Newkirk, Oklahoma, United States
| 
|-
| Win
| align=center| 16–7
| Steve Kinnison
| Decision (unanimous)
| Chicago Cagefighting Championship
| 
| align=center| 3
| align=center| 5:00
| Villa Park, Illinois, United States
| 
|-
| Win
| align=center| 15–7
| Josh Kasee
| Submission (rear-naked choke)
| Ruckus Entertainment: Ruckus 4
| 
| align=center| 1
| align=center| 4:56
| Addison, Illinois, United States
| 
|-
| Win
| align=center| 14–7
| Jared McMahan
| Submission (guillotine choke)
| Chicago Cagefighting Championship
| 
| align=center| 1
| align=center| 1:19
| Villa Park, Illinois, United States
| 
|-
| Loss
| align=center| 13–7
| Hiroyuki Takaya
| KO (punches)
| Dream 16
| 
| align=center| 1
| align=center| 1:45
| Nagoya, Japan
| 
|-
| Win
| align=center| 13–6
| Pablo Alfonso
| Submission (rear-naked choke)
| Ruckus Entertainment: Ruckus Invades Navy Pier
| 
| align=center| 1
| align=center| 2:32
| Chicago, Illinois, United States
| 
|-
| Win
| align=center| 12–6
| William Jochum
| Submission (guillotine choke)
| Lords of War 1
| 
| align=center| 1
| align=center| 1:03
| Addison, Illinois, United States
| 
|-
| Loss
| align=center| 11–6
| Yoshiro Maeda
| Submission (rear-naked choke)
| Dream 12
| 
| align=center| 1
| align=center| 3:36
| Osaka, Japan
| 
|-
| Loss
| align=center| 11–5
| Mike Easton
| Decision (split)
| UWC 7: Redemption
| 
| align=center| 5
| align=center| 5:00
| Fairfax, Virginia, United States
| 
|-
| Loss
| align=center| 11–4
| Joe Warren
| TKO (doctor stoppage)
| Dream 7
| 
| align=center| 1
| align=center| 10:00
| Saitama, Japan
| 
|-
| Loss
| align=center| 11–3
| Will Ribeiro
| Decision (split)
| WEC 34: Faber vs. Pulver
| 
| align=center| 3
| align=center| 5:00
| Sacramento, California, United States
| 
|-
| Loss
| align=center| 11–2
| Miguel Torres
| Submission (guillotine choke)
| WEC 32: Condit vs. Prater
| 
| align=center| 1
| align=center| 3:59
| Rio Rancho, New Mexico, United States
| 
|-
| Win
| align=center| 11–1
| Rani Yahya
| Decision (unanimous)
| WEC 30
| 
| align=center| 5
| align=center| 5:00
| Las Vegas, Nevada, United States
| 
|-
| Win
| align=center| 10–1
| Eddie Wineland
| Decision (unanimous)
| WEC 26: Condit vs. Alessio
| 
| align=center| 5
| align=center| 5:00
| Las Vegas, Nevada, United States
| 
|-
| Win
| align=center| 9–1
| Mike Bennett
| Submission (rear-naked choke)
| KOTC: Hard Knocks
| 
| align=center| 1
| align=center| 2:44
| Rockford, Illinois, United States
| 
|-
| Win
| align=center| 8–1
| Sam Jackson
| Submission (rear-naked choke)
| XFO 14
| 
| align=center| 1
| align=center| 2:36
| Lakemoor, Illinois, United States
| 
|-
| Win
| align=center| 7–1
| Mike Bennetta
| Submission (guillotine choke)
| Courage Fighting Championships 7
| 
| align=center| 1
| align=center| 0:45
| Decatur, Illinois, United States
| 
|-
| Win
| align=center| 6–1
| Aaron Jamieson
| Submission (punches)
| Midwest Absolute Challenge 3
| 
| align=center| 1
| align=center| 0:45
| Countryside, Illinois, United States
| 
|-
| Win
| align=center| 5–1
| Mike Lindquist
| Submission (rear-naked choke)
| Evolution Fighting Championships 2
| 
| align=center| 1
| align=center| 1:40
| Machesney Park, Illinois, United States
| 
|-
| Loss
| align=center| 4–1
| Matt Fiordirosa
| Decision (unanimous)
| XFO 12: Outdoor War 2
| 
| align=center| 3
| align=center| 5:00
| Island Lake, Illinois, United States
| 
|-
| Win
| align=center| 4–0
| Nick Hoff
| Submission (rear-naked choke)
| Courage Fighting Championships 6
| 
| align=center| 1
| align=center| 2:24
| Island Lake, Illinois, United States
| 
|-
| Win
| align=center| 3–0
| Ben Miller
| Submission (rear-naked choke)
| Evolution Fighting Championships
| 
| align=center| 1
| align=center| 2:49
| Machesney Park, Illinois, United States
| 
|-
| Win
| align=center| 2–0
| Cody Geertz
| Submission (rear-naked choke)
| Iowa Challenge 29
| 
| align=center| 1
| align=center| 1:01
| Quincy, Illinois, United States
| 
|-
| Win
| align=center| 1–0
| Jesse Rongey
| Submission (guillotine choke)
| Courage Fighting Championships 5
| 
| align=center| 1
| align=center| 0:27 
| Decatur, Illinois, United States
|

References

External links
Chase Beebe's WEC profile

1985 births
American male mixed martial artists
Mixed martial artists from Illinois
Bantamweight mixed martial artists
Mixed martial artists utilizing wrestling
World Extreme Cagefighting champions
Sportspeople from Chicago
Living people